Alex Afonso (born 24 March 1981 in Jaú, São Paulo) was a Brazilian football (soccer) forward.

Career 
Alex Afonso previously played for Fortaleza, Portuguesa and Palmeiras. On 20 April 2009 Paraná Clube bought the new player from Miami FC in the USL First Division., the player signed until June 2009.

On 1 July 2010, Alex Afonso moved to Grupo Desportivo Estoril Praia in the Portugal.

Honors

Individual
USL First Division Top Scorer: 2008

References

External links

Guardian's Stats Centre

Brazilian footballers
1981 births
Living people
F.C. Alverca players
Clube Atlético Bragantino players
Fortaleza Esporte Clube players
Guarani FC players
Ituano FC players
Marília Atlético Clube players
Sociedade Esportiva Palmeiras players
Associação Portuguesa de Desportos players
Grêmio Osasco Audax Esporte Clube players
Esporte Clube São Bento players
USL First Division players
Miami FC (2006) players
Portimonense S.C. players
G.D. Estoril Praia players
Rio Claro Futebol Clube players
Association football forwards
People from Jaú